Halanaerobaculum is a halophilic, anaerobic, non-spore-forming, rod-shaped and non-motile genus of bacteria from the family of Halobacteroidaceae with one known species (Halanaerobaculum tunisiense). Halanaerobaculum tunisiense has been isolated from hypersaline sediments from the salt lake Chott el Djerid in Tunisia.

See also
 List of bacterial orders
 List of bacteria genera

References

Clostridia
Bacteria genera
Taxa described in 2001
Monotypic bacteria genera